Mary Habicht (born December 10, 1943) is an American former tennis player.

Habicht, a left-handed player, was active on tour in the 1960s.

An American of German-Irish descent, Habicht was living in São Paulo when she started on tour and some sources have her competing as a Brazilian. She was seeded 12th at the 1963 French Championships and made it to the fourth round, where she lost to Ann Jones. In 1966 she reached third round of the Wimbledon Championships.

References

1943 births
Living people
American female tennis players
American people of German descent
American people of Irish descent
American expatriate sportspeople in Brazil